'Robert R. Montgomery (September 8, 1843 - March 7, 1930) was an American inventor who created the fly swatter in 1900. Prior to that, flies were usually killed with folded newspapers.

 Montgomery sold his patent to John L. Bennett, a wealthy inventor and industrialist, who subsequently improved on Montgomery's design.

References 

American inventors
1843 births
1930 deaths